Pierluigi Cappelluzzo (born 9 June 1996) is an Italian footballer who plays as striker.

Career
Cappelluzzo is a youth exponent from Siena. He scored his first Serie B goal on his debut on 8 February 2014 against Bari. He joined Hellas Verona in 2014 from Siena.

In January 2017 he signed a new -year contract.

On 5 July 2017 he was loaned to Pescara.

On 30 January 2019 he was loaned to Imolese.

On 24 August 2019 he joined Pistoiese on loan.

On 5 October 2020 Verona sold his rights to Serie C club Viterbese. The contract with Viterbese was terminated by mutual consent on 1 February 2021.

References

1996 births
Living people
People from Montepulciano
Sportspeople from the Province of Siena
Italian footballers
Association football forwards
A.C.N. Siena 1904 players
Hellas Verona F.C. players
Delfino Pescara 1936 players
Imolese Calcio 1919 players
U.S. Pistoiese 1921 players
U.S. Viterbese 1908 players
Serie B players
Serie C players
Footballers from Tuscany